Fort Augusta was a stronghold in Northumberland County, Pennsylvania, in the upper Susquehanna Valley from the time of the French and Indian War to the close of the American Revolution.

The fort was erected by Colonel William Clapham in 1756 at a site now within the limits of the city of Sunbury, n the site of the Lenape village of Shamokin, which was abandoned only a few weeks before construction of the fort began. Named for Augusta of Saxe-Gotha, the mother of King George III, Fort Augusta was the largest of the Provincial forts. It was first constructed as part of the British defense against the raids of the French and Indians from the upper Allegheny region. Later, it served as an American fortress to aid in protecting settlers of the upper Susquehanna from Britain's Indian allies to the north.

During the French and Indian War in 1756, several hundred French and Indian troops traveled the Great Shamokin Path in an effort to destroy Fort Augusta, the main stronghold of the English at the junction of the East and West branches of the Susquehanna River.  This army was gathered from the French posts at Duquesne, Kittanning, Venango and Le Boeuf and assembled at the mouth of Anderson Creek, near the present location of Curwensville, Clearfield County, Pennsylvania.  Here, crude boats, rafts and bateaux were constructed for passage down the Susquehanna River for the proposed attack.  They dragged along with them two small brass cannon, but after reconnoitering found the distance too great for the guns to shoot from the hill opposite the fort.  The defense at Fort Augusta was strong enough to resist attack by storming or by siege, and the attack was abandoned.  A British defeat at Fort Augusta may have altered the history of the course of the French and Indian War.

During the American Revolutionary War, Fort Augusta  became the headquarters of the military department of the upper Susquehanna. Fort Augusta was dismantled in 1796.

Today, on the site of the old Fort, the Northumberland County Historical Society has its headquarters in the "Hunter House Museum." The museum contains historical and archaeological artifacts dealing with Fort Augusta and items of local history. It also contains a well and the original powder magazine that were here during the time of the original Fort Augusta. There is also a genealogical library of material on early families in Northumberland County and surrounding counties.  The museum is located at 1150 North Front Street, Sunbury, Pennsylvania. A model of the fort, built in 2013, stands in the front of the museum as a replica of the original model, which was built in 1939, and taken down in 1974.  The model of the fort was reconstructed in 2013 and rededicated on July 5, 2014.

The fort's underground powder magazine and the original well still exist.

See also
List of Forts in the United States
William Clapham

External links
3rd Battalion, Pennsylvania Regiment of Foot, The Augusta Regiment, Burd's Company (Historical Reenactment Group)
Fort Augusta - Stronghold in the Wilderness: 1756-1794
National Park Service - Colonials and Patriots: Survey of Historic Sites and Buildings
Northumberland County Historical Society
Sunbury: A History - Map of Fort Augusta

French and Indian War forts
Forts in Pennsylvania
Museums in Northumberland County, Pennsylvania
American Revolutionary War forts
Military and war museums in Pennsylvania
Colonial forts in Pennsylvania
British forts in the United States
Sunbury, Pennsylvania
1756 establishments in Pennsylvania